Desulfovibrio biadhensis  is a Gram-negative, non-spore-forming, anaerobic, mesophilic, slightly halophilic, sulfate-reducing and motile bacterium from the genus of Desulfovibrio which has been isolated from a thermal spring in Tunisia.

References

External links
Type strain of Desulfovibrio biadhensis at BacDive -  the Bacterial Diversity Metadatabase	

Bacteria described in 2015
Desulfovibrio